Slovakia is scheduled to compete at the 2019 European Games, in Minsk, Belarus from 21 to 30 June 2019.

The Slovak Olympic and Sports Committee sent a total of 74 athletes to the Games, 45 men and 29 women, to compete in 13 sports.

Medalists

| width=78% align=left valign=top |

|width=22% align=left valign=top |

Archery

Men

Women

Mixed

Athletics

Men
Track & road events

Field events

Women
Track & road events

Field events

Mixed
Track & road events

Team 

Reserves:
Tomáš Zeman
Jakub Bottlik
Patrik Dӧmӧtӧr
Stanislava Lajčáková

Key
Note–Ranks given for track events are within the athlete's heat only
Q = Qualified for the next round
q = Qualified for the next round as a fastest loser or, in field events, by position without achieving the qualifying target
NR = National record
N/A = Round not applicable for the event
Bye = Athlete not required to compete in round
NM = No mark

Badminton

Boxing

Men

Canoe sprint

Men

Women

Cycling

Road

Track

Sprint

Pursuit

Omnium

Scratch

Madison

Gymnastics

Men
Individual

Women
Individual

Judo

Karate

Women

Sambo

Russia sent eight athletes for the sambo event.

Women

Shooting 

Men

Women

Mixed

Table Tennis

Men

Women

Mixed

Wrestling

Men's freestyle

References

Nations at the 2019 European Games
European Games
2019